Metarctia salmonea is a moth of the subfamily Arctiinae. It was described by Sergius G. Kiriakoff in 1957. It is found in Angola.

References

 

Endemic fauna of Angola
Metarctia
Moths described in 1957